The Cameroonian records in swimming are the fastest ever performances of swimmers from Cameroon, which are recognised and ratified by the Fédération Camerounaise de Natation et de Sauvetage.

All records were set in finals unless noted otherwise.

Long Course (50 m)

Men

Women

Short Course (25 m)

Men

Women

References

Cameroon
Records
Swimming